The Jiao River is a river of Shandong, China. It is part of the Yellow Sea basin.

See also
List of rivers in China

References

Rivers of Shandong